Klewer Market is the largest textile market in Solo City, Indonesia. The market which located beside Keraton Surakarta is also shopping center for batik traders from Yogyakarta, Surabaya, Semarang and other cities in Java. This market have two floors and can accommodate 1,467 traders with a number of stalls around 2,064 units.  Klewer market not only as a center of economy, but also a tourist destination and a symbol of Solo city.

27 December 2014 Fire 

On 27 December 2014 evening, the whole market was burned down.

References 

Buildings and structures in Surakarta
Tourist attractions in Surakarta
Retail markets in Indonesia
Textile industry of Indonesia
Clothing industry disasters
2014 disasters in Indonesia
2014 fires in Asia